The 2018 FC Aktobe season was the 25th successive season that the club playing in the Kazakhstan Premier League, the highest tier of association football in Kazakhstan. Aktobe finished the season in 12th and were relegated from the Premier League for the first time. In the Kazakhstan Cup, they were knocked out by Irtysh Pavlodar at the Last 16 stage.

Season events
On 9 January, Aleksandr Sednyov was appointed as the club's manager.

On 18 February, Aktobe were deducted 6-points by the Football Federation of Kazakhstan due to debts owed to former player Dele Adeleye. On 14 March, Aktobe were handed a further six point deduction for unpaid debts to former player Nemanja Nikolić.

New Contracts
On 3 January, Marcos Pizzelli extended his contract with Aktobe until the end of 2019.

On 4 January, Saša Marjanović extended his contract with Aktobe until the end of 2019.

On 9 January, Aslanbek Kakimov extended his contract with Aktobe until the end of 2019.

On 11 January, Vitali Volkov extended his contract with Aktobe until the end of 2019.

On 25 January, Milan Radin extended his contract with Aktobe until the end of 2019.

On 30 January, Hrvoje Miličević extended his contract with Aktobe until the end of 2019.

Squad

Transfers

In

Out

Released

Trial

Friendlies

Competitions

Premier League

Results summary

Results by round

Results

League table

Kazakhstan Cup

Squad statistics

Appearances and goals

|-
|colspan="14"|Players away from Aktobe on loan:
|-
|colspan="14"|Players who left Aktobe during the season:

|}

Goal scorers

Disciplinary record

References

External links
 

FC Aktobe seasons
Aktobe